Mantura chrysanthemi is a species of Chrysomelidae family, that is common across the Palearctic realm from Ireland England, Turkey west to the Carpathians, and also in Algeria, Morocco.

References

Beetles described in 1803
Alticini
Taxa named by Wilhelm Daniel Joseph Koch